The 2008 Guam Republican presidential caucuses, also called the Guam state convention, took place on March 8, 2008. The approximately 500 people who attended the convention chose six delegates to represent Guam at the 2008 Republican National Convention. John McCain won all six of the delegates. Guam also sent three unpledged party delegates to the party convention, for a total delegation of nine.

The caucuses had been tentatively scheduled for February 16 but later changed.

Results

See also 
 2008 United States presidential straw poll in Guam
 2008 United States presidential election
 2008 Guam Democratic presidential caucuses

References

Republican caucuses
Guam
2008